Labial–velar consonants are doubly articulated at the velum and the lips, such as . They are sometimes called "labiovelar consonants", a term that can also refer to labialized velars, such as the stop consonant  and the approximant .

Labial-velars are often written as digraphs.

Globally, these types of consonants are quite rare, only existing in two regions: West and Central Africa on the one hand, Eastern New Guinea and northern Vanuatu on the other.

Labial-velar stops
Truly doubly articulated labial-velars include the stops  and the nasal . To pronounce them, one must attempt to say the velar consonants but then close their lips for the bilabial component, and then release the lips. While 90% of the occlusion overlaps, the onset of the velar occurs slightly before that of the labial, and the release of the labial occurs slightly after that of the velar so the preceding vowel sounds as if it were followed by a velar, and the following vowel sounds as if it were preceded by a labial.

Phonemic labial–velars occur in the majority of languages in West and Central Africa (for example in the name of Laurent Gbagbo, former president of Ivory Coast; they are found in many Niger–Congo languages as well as in the Ubangian, Chadic and Central Sudanic families), and are relatively common in the eastern end of New Guinea. In Southeast Asia, they occur in the Adu dialect of Nuosu (Yi), which aside from its isolated location, is unusual in having a relatively large inventory of labial-velar consonants, including the rare aspirated version: .

Labial–velar stops also occur as ejective  and implosive  (often transcribed ). Floyd (1981) reports a voiceless implosive  from Igbo. 

The Yele language of Rossel Island, Papua New Guinea, has both labial–velars and labial–alveolar consonants. Labial–velar stops and nasals also occur in Vietnamese but only word-finally.

These sounds are clearly single consonants rather than consonant clusters. The following possibilities are possible if tone is ignored:

Labialized labial-velars
Some languages, especially in Papua New Guinea and in Vanuatu, combine the labial–velar consonants with a labial–velar approximant release: , . The extinct language Volow had a prenasalised labial-velar stop with labialization .

Velar labial clicks

Bilabial clicks are stops that involve closure at both the lips and the soft palate. Treatments often analyze the dorsal articulation as part of the airstream mechanism, and so consider such stops to be labial. However, there may be a distinction between the velar labial clicks  and the uvular labial clicks , which is not captured if they are described as simply labial.

See also

 Place of articulation
 List of phonetics topics

Notes

References

Place of articulation
Labial–velar consonants